Lesila Fiapule (born 22 October 2001) is a Samoan weightlifter who has represented Samoa at the Pacific Mini Games and Youth Olympic Games.

Fiapule was educated at Avele College and has been lifting since she was 15. She represented Samoa at the 2018 Oceania Weightlifting Championships in Nouméa, winning three bronze medals in the +90kg division. Later that year she represented Samoa at the 2018 Summer Youth Olympics  in Buenos Aires, Argentina. At the 2019 Junior World Weightlifting Championships in Suva, Fiji she came 7th in the +87kg division.

At the 2022 Pacific Mini Games in Saipan, Northern Marianas Islands, she won a gold and two silvers in the 87+ kg division.

References

Living people
2001 births
Samoan female weightlifters
Weightlifters at the 2018 Summer Youth Olympics
21st-century Samoan people